Wiener Schachzeitung (or Wiener Schach-Zeitung, "Viennese Chess Bulletin") was the name of several Austrian chess periodicals published in Vienna between 1855 and 1949.

Original publications (1855 and 1887-1888) 
The original publication, the first Austrian chess magazine, was founded by Ernst Falkbeer in January 1855. He envisaged it as Austria's premier chess magazine, modeling it after the prestigious Berliner Schachzeitung. Due to financial problems it lasted only 9 issues (January–September).

In July 1887 the Viennese player Josef Berger (not to be confused with Johann Berger) and Samuel Gold, best known as Carl Schlechter's chess teacher, established a new magazine of the same name. This magazine was discontinued in March 1888 after only 9 issues.

Die Wiener Schachzeitung (1898–1916) 
In 1898 editors Hugo Fähndrich, Alexander Halprin and Georg Marco founded a new magazine of the same name. The primary editor was Marco, who also wrote most of the material. A total of 284 issues were published; it was published monthly from 1898-1908, and twice monthly from 1909 until April 1915 (though publication was often sporadic). Originally the organ of the Vienna Chess Club, it grew to become one of the leading chess periodicals of its time. It published over 2200 games from most of the major tournaments with detailed annotations.

Aron Nimzowitsch worked closely with the Wiener Schachzeitung; in the March 1913 issue (5-8) he published a critique of Siegbert Tarrasch titled 'Does The Modern Chess Game' by Dr. Tarrasch actually correspond to a modern view?". This essay marked the beginning of a new stage in the development of chess theory, leading to the beginning of the hypermodern school of chess. The magazine ceased publication in 1916 due to the First World War.

(Neue) Wiener Schachzeitung (1923–1938) 
In March 1923 the magazine was reestablished as the "Neue Wiener Schachzeitung"; the name was reverted to the "Wiener Schachzeitung" the following year. The driving forces were the strong amateur Robert Wahle and publisher Akim Lewit, who were also founding members of the chess section of the Jewish sports club Hakoah Vienna. This publication was considered inferior to its predecessor, but it continued to promote new chess ideas, publishing an article by Nimzowitsch entitled "Surrender of the Centre - a Prejudice" in 1923.

From 1926 until June 1935 the magazine was edited by Albert Becker, who was able to solicit contributions from leading masters and theoreticians of the day. In January 1936 a new editorial team of Erich Eliskases, Jacques Hannak and Roman Meyer took over. The magazine abruptly ceased publication in March 1938 following the annexation of Austria by the Third Reich.

Attempted revival (1948-49)
An unsuccessful attempt was made to revive the Wiener Schachzeitung after the end of World War II. It appeared in July 1948, claiming to be the "official organ of the Austrian Chess Federation", but folded in late 1949. The chief editor was Edwin Hofmann, with the problem section edited by Josef Halumbirek.

References

 Festschrift der Wiener Schachzeitung 1898/1923–1933. Contributions by Hans Kmoch, Aron Nimzowitsch, Savielly Tartakower and others
 Michael Negele: "Glanz & Elend des Schachorgans. Die bewegte Geschichte der Wiener Schachzeitung", in: Karl, 2/2009, p20–27
 Litmanowicz & Giżycki, "Szachy od A do Z", Volume II, Warsaw 1987, p1320

External links
 Wiener Schachzeitung at Austrian National Library digital archive (ANNO – Austrian Newspapers Online)

1855 establishments in the Austrian Empire
1949 disestablishments in Austria
Chess in Austria
Chess periodicals
Defunct magazines published in Austria
German-language magazines
Magazines established in 1855
Magazines disestablished in 1949
Magazines published in Vienna
Monthly magazines published in Austria